Nivedyam may refer to:

Nivedyam (1978 film), Malayalam film released in 1978 starring Prem Nazir and K R Vijaya
Nivedyam (2007 film), Malayalam film released in 2007 starring Vinu Mohan and Bhama